The Philippine dawn bat (Eonycteris robusta) is a species of megabat in the family Pteropodidae found in the Philippines.

References

Mammals described in 1913
Eonycteris
Endemic fauna of the Philippines
Mammals of the Philippines
Bats of Southeast Asia
Taxa named by Gerrit Smith Miller Jr.